Bharya Biddalu is a 1972 Indian Telugu-language drama film, produced by A. V. Subba Rao under the Prasad Art Productions banner and directed by T. Rama Rao. It stars Akkineni Nageswara Rao and Jayalalithaa, with music composed by K. V. Mahadevan. The film is a remake of the Telugu-language film Bratuku Theruvu (1953), also starring Nageswara Rao.

Plot
The film begins with Mohan (Akkineni Nageswara Rao) returning to his village after completing his studies when he finds that his family has huge debts. So, he decides to support them consisting of his wife Susheela (Krishna Kumari), 5-year-old daughter, mother Jayamma (Hemalatha) 3 sisters and 2 brothers. Hence, he moves to the city in search of a job but fails. Desperate, Mohan fortunately meets his childhood friend Dr. Manohar (Jaggayya), who makes his acquaintance with a millionaire Raja Rao (Gummadi) and leaves for abroad. Raja Rao appreciates him, offers him a job provided he should be single. Due to his exigency, Mohan takes the job claiming himself as single. Meanwhile, Raja Rao's daughter Radha (Jayalalitha), a heart patient and paralyzed person whose condition is very tender comes back from abroad. Radha feels relief in the friendly and breezy company of Mohan and gradually regains her vigor when she falls for him. Now Mohan is under a dichotomy as he is unable to reveal the truth. Meanwhile, Mohan's elder sister Kanaka Durga (Suryakantham) a shrewish woman, throws the family out and they land at the city. Accidentally, Mohan spots and places them at Manohar's house. Eventually, Kanaka Durga and her husband Ramadasu (Venkateswara Rao) also arrive at the town who schemes and takes shelter at Seshu's (Rajababu) residence, a person who aspires to marry Radha. After a few comic incidents, they get reformed, which Mohan witnesses and brings them back. Here, the wheel of fortune makes Radha and Susheela as friends when Mohan leading the dual life makes a daring effort to avoid all the parties. Right now, Raja Rao decides to couple up Radha with Mohan and plans for their engagement, but Mohan is not ready to bow for this betrayal. During that time, Susheela collapses learning that the bridegroom is her husband and silently leaves the place. Thereafter, the entire family accuses Mohan when he decides to confess his blunder. At that point in time, envious Seshu kidnaps Radha when Mohan rescues and divulges the reality to her. Though she misconstrues him in the beginning, later she understands his virtue and even affirms it to Raja Rao. At last, Manohar checks in and expresses his childhood love towards Radha, which she too accepts. Finally, the movie ends a happy note with the marriage of Manohar and Radha.

Cast
Akkineni Nageshwara Rao as Mohan
Jayalalithaa as Radha
Krishna Kumari as Susheela
Gummadi as Raja Rao
Jaggayya as Dr. Manohar 
Allu Ramalingaiah as Ramanadham 
Raja Babu as Seshu 
P. J. Sarma as Nagabhushanam 
Venkateswara Rao as Ramadasu 
Potti Prasad as Sundaram
Vivekanand as Krishna 
Suryakantham as Kanaka Durga
Hemalatha  as Jayamma
Suma as Shanti 
Baby Sridevi as Mohan's little sister

Soundtrack
Music composed by K. V. Mahadevan. Lyrics were written by Acharya Aatreya.

References

External links 
 

1970s Telugu-language films
1972 films
Films directed by T. Rama Rao
Films scored by K. V. Mahadevan
Remakes of Indian films